Lakeside Park is a home rule-class city in Kenton County, Kentucky, United States. As of the 2020 census, the city had a total population of 2,841. It is a suburb in the Cincinnati metropolitan area.

History
The area that is now Lakeside Park was part of a farm granted to John Leathers in 1785. During the Civil War, the Covington and Lexington Turnpike which passes through town was guarded by forts.  Lakeside Park was incorporated in 1930. The first subdivisions were championed by Kenton County commissioner Paul Hesser, who also pushed for incorporation. It was strategically placed next to the Covington and Lexington Turnpike to prevent annexation by Fort Mitchell.

Geography 
Lakeside Park is located at  (39.033113, -84.568160). The city is bisected by the Dixie Highway, U.S. Route 25, and Interstate 275 bypasses Lakeside Park to the south.

Demographics 

As of the census of 2000, there were 2,869 people, 1,237 households, and 755 families residing in the city. The racial makeup of the city was 96.72% White, 1.60% African American, 0.10% Native American, 0.28% Asian, 0.59% from other races, and 0.70% from two or more races. 1.15% of the population were Hispanic or Latino of any race.

There were 1,237 households, out of which 27.4% had children under the age of 18 living with them, 49.9% were married couples living together, 8.0% had a female householder with no husband present, and 38.9% were non-families. 31.9% of all households were made up of individuals, and 12.2% had someone living alone who was 65 years of age or older. The average household size was 2.30 and the average family size was 2.95.

In the city, the population was spread out, with 23.0% under the age of 18, 10.8% from 18 to 24, 27.6% from 25 to 44, 23.4% from 45 to 64, and 15.2% who were 65 years of age or older. The median age was 37 years. For every 100 females, there were 91.0 males. For every 100 females age 18 and over, there were 85.6 males.

The median income for a household in the city was $50,781, and the median income for a family was $70,000. Males had a median income of $50,171 versus $30,329 for females. The per capita income for the city was $29,711. About 0.5% of families and 1.2% of the population were below the poverty line, including 0.1% of those under the age of 18 and 4.2% of those 65 and older.

References

External links
  City of Lakeside Park Official Website

Cities in Kentucky
Cities in Kenton County, Kentucky